The Serik Akhmetov Cabinet was the 8th government of Kazakhstan led by Serik Akhmetov. It was established on 24 September 2012, after Prime Minister Karim Massimov resigned the post that he had held since January 2007 and was appointed as the Head of the Presidential Administration. President Nursultan Nazarbayev nominated Akhmetov to be the new PM who was unanimously approved by the Parliament. 

As a result of the Kazakh tenge's devaluation in March 2014, Akhmetov was dismissed by Nazarbayev who reappointed Massimov on 2 April 2014. Akhmetov remained in the Massimov's cabinet after being appointed as the Minister of Defense on 3 April 2014.

Composition

References 

Cabinets of Kazakhstan
2012 in Kazakhstan
Cabinets established in 2012
2012 establishments in Kazakhstan